Lionel Naccache (born 27 March 1969 in Sarcelles) is a French neurologist and specialist in cognitive neuroscience.

References

1969 births
People from Sarcelles
French neurologists
École Normale Supérieure alumni
Living people